is Rythem's second single. It was released on August 6, 2003 under Sony Music Entertainment Japan. The title track is a rearrangement of the B-side song in their previous single Harmonia and was used as the ending theme for the anime series Hamtaro. This single only reached #74 in the Oricon weekly charts.

Track listing
Tenkyu (New Summer Version)
Composition/Lyrics: Rythem
Arrangement: CHOKKAKU
Komugiiro no RABUSONGU
Composition: Yui Nītsu
Lyrics: Rythem
Arrangement: Nobuyuki Shimizu
Tenkyu (New Summer Version) -instrumental-
Komugiiro no RABUSONGU -instrumental-

2003 singles
Rythem songs
2003 songs
Sony Music Entertainment Japan singles